Thomas Palmer Thompson (born August 15, 1995) is an American professional soccer player who plays as a right-back for Major League Soccer club San Jose Earthquakes.

Career
Thompson played one year of college soccer at Indiana University where he scored five goals and one assist in 12 matches and was named Big Ten Freshman of the Year in 2013, before signing a Homegrown Player contract with San Jose Earthquakes on March 14, 2014.

Thompson made his professional debut on June 7, 2014 as an 89th-minute substitute in a 0–1 loss to Toronto FC.

On June 26, 2014, Thompson signed on loan with San Jose's USL Pro affiliate club Sacramento Republic FC.

Thompson recorded his first MLS assist in a 1–1 draw against Orlando City SC on May 17, 2017, coming off the bench in the 82nd minute to assist Chris Wondolowski's game-tying goal in the 83rd minute.

He scored his first MLS goal on July 4, 2017, in the 2nd minute of a 4–2 loss to Atlanta United FC at Bobby Dodd Stadium. Thompson's first goal came after making 64 MLS appearances over four years and logging 2,633 league minutes. On August 7, he was named to the MLS Team of the Week after recording his third assist of the season in the Earthquakes' 2–1 victory over Columbus Crew SC on August 5. He was announced as a nominee for the MLS Humanitarian of the Year Award on October 14, 2017. On October 22 he received San Jose's club award for Humanitarian of the Year after leading a number of youth clinics in the area and for actively aiding relief efforts in the wake of the 2017 California floods.

Personal
Tommy's older brother is fellow soccer player Tanner, who played for Indy Eleven in the North American Soccer League. His father is former-United States international soccer player Gregg Thompson.

Statistics

Gallery

Honors
Sacramento Republic
USL Cup: 2014

References

External links

1995 births
Living people
2015 CONCACAF U-20 Championship players
American soccer players
Association football forwards
Indiana Hoosiers men's soccer players
Major League Soccer players
People from Placer County, California
Reno 1868 FC players
Sacramento Republic FC players
San Jose Earthquakes players
Soccer players from California
Sportspeople from Greater Sacramento
United States men's under-20 international soccer players
USL Championship players
Soccer players from Illinois
Homegrown Players (MLS)